Beta-D (3,4,5-trimethoxy-beta-dideuterophenethylamine) is a lesser-known psychedelic drug. It is one of the few phenethylamines used as a recreational drug that is enriched in deuterium. Beta-D can be prepared as a sulfate salt or as a hydrochloride salt. It is the beta-dideutero analog of mescaline. Beta-D was first synthesized by Alexander Shulgin. In his book PiHKAL, the dosage is listed as approximately 200–400 mg for the sulfate salt, and 178–356 mg for the hydrochloride salt. Its effects last for 12 hours. Beta-D has a very rapid onset. It produces an increased appreciation of music and a strong connection with God. Very little data exists about the pharmacological properties, metabolism, and toxicity of Beta-D.

References

See also 
 4-D (psychedelic), another deuterated analog of mescaline

Psychedelic phenethylamines
Deuterated compounds